Awake is a 2007 American conspiracy thriller film written and directed by Joby Harold (in his directorial debut). It stars Hayden Christensen, Jessica Alba, Terrence Howard and Lena Olin. The film was released in the United States and Canada on November 30, 2007.

Plot
Young billionaire Clay Beresford, Jr. is in love with beautiful Samantha "Sam" Lockwood, his mother's personal assistant. Clay requires a heart transplant and Dr. Jack Harper is Clay's heart surgeon and friend. Clay asks Dr. Harper to arrange his elopement with Sam and they marry privately at midnight, then Clay goes to the hospital for the operation. While Clay's mother Lilith awaits completion of his surgery, Clay encounters anesthesia awareness. The surgical pain causes Clay to have a clairvoyant experience exposing Dr. Harper's plot to murder him, also revealing that Sam worked at the hospital under Dr. Harper and has conspired with him against Clay. Sam's plan was to poison the donor heart by injecting Adriamycin to cause its rejection, thus murdering Clay to collect insurance money to pay off Dr. Harper's malpractice lawsuits.

The scheme unravels and Lilith, realizing what has happened, sacrifices her own life so that Clay, who is close to death, can live: she dies by suicide so her heart can be switched for the poisoned one, and save Clay. While Sam tries to get away with what she did, Dr. Harper feels guilty and he holds onto proof so she can be arrested too. Another surgical team takes over the operation, as Clay barely clings to life and the conspirators are arrested. The new team takes Lilith's heart and transplants it into Clay's body, as Clay and Lilith have their final moments together in spirit (in an out-of-body experience).

The new head surgeon announces that Clay has come back to life, as the new team stitch Clay's wound. Clay, in spirit, is still in the afterlife with Lilith, tries to take his own life to stay with his mother. Clay makes his new heart stop beating and the surgeons have to use the defibrillator in attempt to revive Clay. As Clay resists being revived, Lilith forces Clay (in the "afterlife-world") to revisit a scene from his childhood, when Lilith accidentally killed Clay's abusive father. This scene reveals the truth for Clay and connects his childhood flashbacks. After seeing this scene, Clay gives way to revival, and before the surgeons can shock his body again, Clay allows his new heart to begin beating. Clay opens his eyes when the surgeons remove the eye tapes while Harper ends his narratings with "He is awake".

Cast
 Hayden Christensen as Clay Beresford, Jr. 
 Jessica Alba as Samantha "Sam" Lockwood/Tunnel 
 Terrence Howard as Dr. Jack Harper 
 Lena Olin as Lilith Beresford 
 Nathalie Efron as Mary Beresford 
 Fisher Stevens as Dr. Puttnam 
 Arliss Howard as Dr. Neyer 
 Christopher McDonald as Dr. Larry Lupin 
 Georgina Chapman as Nurse Penny Carver 
 David Harbour as Dracula
 Sam Robards as Clay Beresford, Sr.  
 Steven Hinkle as Young Clay

Production
Portions of Awake were filmed on Fordham University's Lincoln Center campus (Lowenstein Hall is converted to look like a hospital; the statue of "St. Peter: Fisher of Men" is visible in the film). In addition, many scenes, including Dr. Jack Harper's office, the cafeteria where Lilith dies by suicide, and the elevator bank, were filmed in Bellevue Hospital.

Reception
The film was not screened in advance for critics. The film opened at #5 at the U.S. Box office in its first opening weekend. As of July 11, 2008 it had a domestic box office gross of $14,377,198 in the U.S., and a total of $32,685,679 worldwide.

Awake received generally negative reviews upon release. The review aggregator Rotten Tomatoes reported that 24% of critics have given the film a positive review based on 62 reviews, with an average rating of 4.23/10. The site's critics consensus reads, "Awake has an interesting premise but would have benefited from tighter performances and more efficient direction and editing." On Metacritic, the film has a weighted average score of 33 out of 100 based on 17 critics, indicating "generally unfavorable reviews". Dennis Harvey of Variety said the film "does have an attention-getting plot hook, but piles on too many narrative gimmicks to maintain suspense or credibility." Roger Ebert of the Chicago Sun-Times defended the film, saying, "I went to a regular theater to see it Friday afternoon, knowing nothing about it except that the buzz was lethal, and sat there completely absorbed. ... I did not anticipate the surprises, did not anticipate them piling on after one another, got very involved in the gory surgical details, and found the supporting soap opera good as such things go". Frank Scheck of The Hollywood Reporter said "[Harold] succeeds in creating a quietly ominous tone that never lets up, with this being the rare modern horror effort that relies on suspense rather than bloodshed."

A group representing anesthesiologists in Ontario criticized the film following its release for having its "science completely wrong." Ontario's Anesthesiologists, a section of the Ontario Medical Association, declared numerous scientific and procedural distortions in the film such as the presentation of improper anesthetic techniques. The group disputes the film's claim that anaesthesia awareness occurred as frequently as one in every 700 patients, although this in turn is debated by anesthesia awareness advocate Carol Weihrer.

Home media

The Region 1-DVD was released on March 4, 2008. Bonus material included an audio commentary by writer/director Joby Harold, seven deleted scenes with optional audio commentary, a behind the scenes featurette, and storyboard-to-film comparisons.

A "Blockbuster Exclusive" edition was also available for rental through Blockbuster Video which includes audio commentary, theatrical trailer, as well as outtakes and bloopers. However, it does not include the other extras included with the original DVD release.

A Blu-ray version was released on November 18, 2008.

References

External links
 
 
 
 DVD Talk discusses the Awake release delay

2007 films
2007 psychological thriller films
2000s English-language films
American psychological thriller films
Films shot in New York City
Films set in hospitals
Mariticide in fiction
Medical-themed films
Films scored by Graeme Revell
Films about medical malpractice
Films about organ transplantation
The Weinstein Company films
Metro-Goldwyn-Mayer films
2007 directorial debut films
2000s American films